The 2018–19 2. Liga is the 26th season of the 2. Liga in Slovakia, since its establishment in 1993.

Teams

Team changes

Stadiums and locations

Personnel and kits
Note: Flags indicate national team as has been defined under FIFA eligibility rules. Players and Managers may hold more than one non-FIFA nationality.

Managerial changes

League table

Season statistics

Top goalscorers

References

External links

2018–19 in Slovak football leagues
2018-19
Slovak